Black Metal may refer to:

 Black metal, a subgenre of heavy metal music
 Black Metal (Dean Blunt album), 2014
 Black Metal (Venom album), 1982
 "Black Metal", song from Venom's album
 Black Metal (comics) graphic novel by Rick Spears

See also 
 Black color in chemical coloring of metals
 "Black Metal ist Krieg", a 2001 song by Nargaroth
 "Black Metallic", a 1991 song by Catherine Wheel
 "Black Metal Sacrifice", a 1999 song by Watain
 Black Metalcore, part of the music genre Metalcore
 Black metaltail, a common species of bird
 Metal Black, album by Venom